Heiko Antons (born 8 November 1951) is a German ice hockey player. He competed in the men's tournament at the 1972 Winter Olympics.

References

External links
 

1951 births
Living people
German ice hockey players
Olympic ice hockey players of West Germany
Ice hockey players at the 1972 Winter Olympics
People from Ostallgäu
Sportspeople from Swabia (Bavaria)